Rupesh Mahesh Amin (born 20 August 1977) is an English first-class cricketer and List A cricketer who played First-class games for  Surrey County Cricket Club and Leicestershire County Cricket Club. He played all his List A games for Surrey.   His highest score in First-class cricket of 12 came when playing for Surrey in the match against Leicestershire.  His best bowling of 4/87 came when playing for Surrey in the match against Somerset County Cricket Club.

His Highest score in List A cricket of 0* came when playing for Surrey against Northamptonshire County Cricket Club.

He also played a total of 63 games for Surrey and Leicestershire second XI.  and 39 Second XI cup games for surrey and Leicestershire second XI.

References

1977 births
Living people
People from Clapham
English cricketers
Surrey cricketers
Leicestershire cricketers
British sportspeople of Indian descent
British Asian cricketers